Hexadecagon is a studio album by the electronic band the Octopus Project. It was released in 2010 by Peek-A-Boo Records.

Critical reception
The Austin Chronicle called Hexadecagon "a concept album that's actually fun to indulge," writing that it "finds [the band] diving headlong into unexplored realms (the 11-minute 'Circling'), and sounding more thoughtful, less cartoonish." Spin wrote: "Hexadecagon is the Tubular Bells of the 8-bit generation, and that’s a compliment."

Track listing

References

2010 albums
The Octopus Project albums
Peek-A-Boo Records albums